Sally is an American situation comedy that aired on NBC during the 1957-1958 television season. The series stars Joan Caulfield as Sally Truesdale, a young saleswoman at a department store who tours Europe with a widow who is the store's wealthy and scatter-brained owner. After the trip is over, Sally returns to work at the store.

Synopsis
Sally Truesdale is a young salesclerk at the Banford & Bleacher Department Store and eligible bachelorette who is reassigned to serve as the traveling companion of the store's wealthy co-owner, the matronly widow Myrtle Banford, during a lengthy trip to Europe. They expect a normal vacation, but Mrs. Banford is eccentric and can be a little daffy, and as the two women travel from city to city, she tends to get into various kinds of trouble, while the fun-loving Sally also is prone to having exciting adventures.

In mid-February 1958, the two women return home, and Sally resumes work as a salesclerk at the Banford & Bleacher Department Store, located in an unidentified large city somewhere in the United States. Working with her at the store in addition to Mrs. Banford are store manager and part-owner Bascomb Bleacher, Sr., his lovable but incompetent son Bascomb Bleacher, Jr., and Jim Kendall, an artist who works in the store's advertising department and becomes Sally's boyfriend.

Cast
 Joan Caulfield...Sally Truesdale
 Marion Lorne...Mrs. Myrtle Banford
 Gale Gordon...Bascomb Bleacher, Sr. (1958)
 Arte Johnson...Bascomb Bleacher, Jr. (1958)
 Johnny Desmond...Jim Kendall (1958)

Production

A Caulross/Paramount Television production, Sally was the first filmed series produced by Paramount Television. Joan Caulfield's husband, movie producer Frank Ross served as producer for the series; it was his first television production. The series included a laugh track.

Reception

After the September 15, 1957, premiere of Sally, Ann Wardell Saunders wrote that the first episode was "too contrived and unrealistic for an adult audience, unless it were given a mid-Victorian setting." As episodes aired over the next two months, it became apparent that viewers found the plots of Sally's and Mrs. Banford's adventures in Europe far-fetched and the constant presence of Caulfield and Marion Lorne without other regular cast members monotonous. Moreover, few American viewers could identify with the wealth, glamorous wardrobes, globe-trotting travel, and international situations depicted in the series. Hollywood reporter Bob Thomas wrote in an October 19, 1957 article, "Judging from last week's program [the "Only in Paris" episode of October 13, 1957], it [Sally] appears to be one of the brighter spots in an otherwise dismal season. It had crisp writing, bright direction and sharp acting by Marion Lorne...and other accomplished actors." However, critics often expressed negative opinions of Sally.

Caulfield at first struck a defiant tone toward criticism and low viewership, saying in mid-October 1957, "If people don't like our show, they just don't have taste. I'm a tough audience. I've done some shows that make me cringe. But some of the Sally shows have made me real proud." Faced with stiff competition from Maverick on ABC and The Jack Benny Program on CBS, however, Sally continued to draw low ratings, to Caulfield's surprise; she told the press, "And to think, we picked the 7:30 time spot ourselves, thinking it'd be a cinch to lick a little old western. Maybe we should have looked into a crystal ball." By the end of November 1957, she was promising changes, with Sally returning to the United States to work in a department store, wearing plainer clothes, and having a steady romantic interest. She also said that scripts would change to reflect broad comedy, and a man would be introduced into Mrs. Banford's life.

Due to Sally′s low ratings, NBC was considering its cancellation by mid-December 1957. On February 8, 1958, an article by Bob de Piante in the Oneonta Star described Sally as "one of the most miserable flops of the current TV season." However, in describing the cast and premise changes Caulfield had promised, which were to roll out in the upcoming February 16 episode, he gave the revamped show a qualified endorsement, writing that Sally′s future was uncertain and that "if NBC is planning the new format just to satisfy a disgruntled sponsor, then the show will end up by the wayside," but adding: "If, however, the network is trying to make an honest change, Sally has the potential of being a top half-hour of entertainment."

NBC promoted the February 16, 1958, broadcast of the first episode of Sally with its new premise and cast it as a "premiere" of the revamped show. However, the changes did not save Sally. In The Philadelphia Inquirer on February 20, 1958, features writer Harry Harris described the overhaul of the show as "frantic but not very amusing" and said that Sally "seems certain to go down the drain." The show lasted only seven episodes with its new premise and cast.

Despite Sally′s failure, Marion Lorne was nominated in 1958 for the Primetime Emmy Award for Outstanding Supporting Actress in a Comedy Series for her portrayal of Myrtle Banford. She lost to Ann B. Davis, who received the award for her work on The Bob Cummings Show.

Caulfield separated from Ross in 1959 and divorced him in 1960. She blamed the end of their marriage on the stress of working together on Sally.

Broadcast history

Sally premiered on NBC on September 15, 1957. It lasted only a single season, and its last episode aired on March 30, 1958. It was broadcast at 7:30 p.m. Eastern Time on Sundays throughout its 26-episode run.

Episodes
SOURCE

References

External links

  
 Sally opening credits on YouTube

1950s American sitcoms
1957 American television series debuts
1958 American television series endings
Black-and-white American television shows
NBC original programming
Television shows set in the United States
English-language television shows